Diuris punctata, commonly known as the purple donkey orchid is a species of orchid which is endemic to south-eastern continental Australia. It has two grass-like leaves and up to ten purple or mauve flowers, often with darker, sometimes yellow marks. A yellow form from near Guyra is probably now extinct.

Description
The flowers are purple or mauve, often with darker, sometimes yellow marks. Flowering occurs from September to December.

Taxonomy and naming
Diuris punctata was first formally described in 1804 by James Edward Smith and the description was published in Exotic Botany. The specific epithet (punctata) is a Latin word meaning "spotted".

Distribution and habitat
The purple donkey orchid is found in New South Wales, the Australian Capital Territory and Victoria growing in forest and grassland. In New South Wales it occurs south from the Moonbi Range and in Victoria north from the Mornington Peninsula. A form known as Diuris punctata var. sulfurea was known from a property near Guyra but is now thought to be extinct. It had smaller, yellow flowers.

Conservation
Diuris punctata is classed as "threatened" in Victoria under the Flora and Fauna Guarantee Act 1988. The main threats to the species are competition from weeds and grasses, grazing and soil disturbance.

References

punctata
Orchids of New South Wales
Orchids of Victoria (Australia)
Orchids of the Australian Capital Territory
Endemic orchids of Australia
Plants described in 1804